The World Festival of Youth and Students is an international event organized by the World Federation of Democratic Youth (WFDY) and the International Union of Students after 1947.

History
The festival has been held regularly since 1947 as an event of global youth solidarity for democracy and against war and imperialism. The largest festival was the 6th, held in 1957 in Moscow, when 34,000 young people from 131 countries attended the event. This festival also marked the international debut of the song "Moscow Nights", which subsequently went on to become a widely recognized Russian song. There were no festivals between 1962 and 1968, as events proposed in Algeria and then Ghana were cancelled due to coups and political turmoil in both countries. Until the 19th festival in Sochi, Russia in 2017 (with 185 countries participating), the largest festival by number of countries with participants was the 13th, held in 1989 in Pyongyang when 177 countries attended the event.

The most recent festival took place in Sochi, Russia, from 13 to 22 October 2017.

Editions

Gallery

References

External links

Official Website of the 17th World Festival of Youth and Students
Official Website of the 19th World Festival of Youth and Students
Official Website of the World Federation of Democratic Youth
Chronology of World Festivals of Youth and Students
16th World Festival of Youth and Students, Official Website
Video of the 16th World Festival of Youth and Students in Caracas
North Korea Youth Festival 1989

 
World Federation of Democratic Youth
Sports festivals
Festivals established in 1947
Recurring sporting events established in 1947